The Lioré et Olivier LeO 9 was a French monoplane fighter built in 1923.

Design and development
The LeO 9 was a low wing monoplane fighter of all-metal construction using a Joukowski aerofoil. Despite excelling in flight tests, the LeO 9 was not ordered into production.

Specifications

References

Bibliography

9
1920s French fighter aircraft
Low-wing aircraft
Aircraft first flown in 1923